Gerardo Bianchi (1220/1225 – March 1, 1302) was an Italian churchman and papal diplomat, an important figure of the War of the Sicilian Vespers.

Life
Gerardo was born in Gainago, in the diocese of Parma, studied law at the University of Bologna, and became canon of the cathedral chapter of Parma.

He began his career in the Roman Curia as a chaplain of Pope Innocent IV (1243-1254) and scriptor in the chancellery (attested in 1245).  He is attested as litterarum apostolicarum contradictorum Auditor (Auditor of the Rota) on April 30, 1277. At the time of his elevation to the Cardinalate he was a Protonotarius apostolicus.

Pope Nicholas III in the Consistory of March 12, 1278, created nine cardinals, among them Gerardo Bianchi, whom he named Cardinal Priest of SS. XII Apostoli. On July 15, 1278 Pope Nicholas notified King Philip III of France that he was sending Cardinal Gerardo to Toulouse, where he would join with Cardinal Hieronymus Masci, O.Min. and Master General John of Vercelli, OP, in bringing about a peace with King Alfonso of Castile.  On August 5 he was granted the right to employ the services of the members of whatever religious order he wished in his Legation to France.  On November 29, the Pope revised his instructions to the three Legates, in accordance with the wishes of the two kings, so that they would hold their meetings in Gascony.  On June 9, 1279, Pope Nicholas threatened King Alfonso with severe penalties for not cooperating with the peace process.

Pope Nicholas III (Orsini) died on August 22, 1280, and Cardinal Bianchi participated in the Conclave which was held in Viterbo, beginning in September, 1280.  Nicholas III was succeeded by the French cardinal Simon de Brion on February 22, 1281, who took the name Martin IV.

On April 12, 1281, Holy Saturday, Pope Martin IV held a Consistory in which he created seven new cardinals, and promoted Cardinal Gerardo to the Order of Cardinal Bishops and assigned him the suburbicarian see of Sabina.

Legate to the Kingdom of Sicily

The Sicilian Vespers, a revolt against the domination of the Island by King Charles of Anjou, which broke out in Palermo at Easter of 1282, shook the island of Sicily.  Thousands of Angevins and other French residents of the island were massacred.  The cities which had expelled the foreigners sent representatives to Pope Martin, begging him to take them under his protection and recognize them as free cities directly under the sovereignty of the Church.  The Pope, always a supporter of King Charles, who had forced his election upon the College of Cardinals, refused. The cities then turned to King Pedro of Aragon for help.

On June 5, 1282, Cardinal Bianchi was appointed papal legate in Sicily, to pacify the kingdom. In August he was sent into Messina, which was besieged, on behalf of Charles I of Naples, but to no effect.  When King Charles and King Alfonso challenged each other to individual combat over their differences in the Autumn of 1282, Pope Martin wrote to King Charles, begging him not to carry out his undertakings.

In 1283, he was sent to Sicily again, to obtain a surrender of the rebellion there after the Sicilian Vespers; but his only success was the surrender of Naples. He was a close advisor to Charles of Salerno, but the sea-power of Roger of Lauria frustrated the campaign.

In March, 1284 he presided over a synod which met in the city of Melfi.  The canons of that council were promulgated on March 28, 1284.

On the death of Charles I of Naples in 1285, he shared the regency of the Kingdom of Sicily with Robert II of Artois. In practical terms, however, power was held by Mary of Hungary, Queen of Naples, wife of the imprisoned Charles II of Naples (the former Prince of Salerno).

He was still Legate and Regent under Honorius IV (1285-1287).  He continued as Legate in Sicily-South Italy (Trani, Messana), 1288-1289

France

In 1290, he was in France on a diplomatic mission with Benedetto Gaetani, on behalf of Pope Nicholas IV, principally to settle differences between France and Aragon and England.  The dispatch of Cardinal Gerardo was announced to King Philip IV in a letter of Pope Nicholas dated March 23, 1290. In June 1290, they were in Lyons, where they adjudicated a case relating to temporal jurisdiction in the city of Lyons which was being contested between the Archbishop of Lyons and the Cathedral Chapter. At the beginning of October, they arrived in Reims, intending to resolve a conflict between the archbishop and the canons. During the dispute the Canons had withdrawn from participation in liturgical activities in the Cathedral, and had forbidden the use of the organ.  The two cardinals suspended the boycott during their visit, and when they issued their decree settling the dispute, they required the Archbishop and Canons to have two statues of the two cardinals made, which would be displayed at the High Altar of the Cathedral during important celebrations.

The following year he and Gaetani were present at signing of the Treaty of Tarascon, negotiated to bring to a conclusion the Aragonese Crusade.

Back in Italy

Cardinal Gerardo Bianchi was Prior Episcoporum of the College of Cardinals from the death of Cardinal Latino Malabranca Orsini on August 9, 1294. In 1297, he consecrated an altar in honor of S. Mary Magdalen in the Lateran Basilica.  He was also  Archpriest of the Lateran Basilica (ca. 1299-1302).

On April 13, 1298, Pope Boniface VIII (1294-1303) granted Cardinal Gerardo permission to carry out his plan to found a monastery for the Cistercians in his home town of Parma in honor of S. Martin de Bozis (S. Martino de Bocci).  On October 3, 1298, the Pope granted to Cardinal Gerardo's monastery, which did not yet have any monks or a Prior, the Priory of S. Leonardo near Parma.

From July 17, 1299 to January 14, 1302, Cardinal Gerardo Bianchi was Legate to the Kingdom of Sicily again.  The Cardinal was again pressed into service, being appointed Legate in Sicily with full powers by Boniface VIII on July 20, 1299. His assigned task was to reconcile Frederick III of Sicily and his rebels with the Roman Church.  He was immediately peppered with one letter after another of advice and mandates as to how to accomplish his task.  He was also assigned a junior cardinal-deacon, Landolfo Brancaccio of S. Angelo in Pescheria, to assist in his work. On February 1, 1300, Cardinal Gerardo appears as Legate again, to whom the Pope sends a letter of complaint, that Philip, Prince of Taranto, the younger son of Charles II of Naples,  had crossed the Straits of Messana, in violation of a papal prohibition.

He died in Rome on March 1, 1302, and was buried in the Lateran Basilica.

Notes and references

Bibliography

 S. Sägmüller, Die Thätigkeit und Stellung der Kardinäle bis Papst Bonifaz VIII., historisch und canonistisch untersucht und dargestellt (Freiburg i. B. 1896).
 Bernhard Pawlicki, Papst Honorius IV. Eine Monographie (Münster 1896).
 Otto Schiff, Studien zur Geschichte Papst Nikolaus' IV. (Berlin 1897) (Historische Studien 5).
 Heinrich Finke, Aus den Tagen Bonifaz VIII. Funde und Forschungen (Münster i. W. 1902).
 O. Cartellieri, Peter von Aragon und die sizilianische Vesper (Heidelberg 1904).
 R. Sternfeld, "Das Konklave von 1280 und die Wahl Martins IV. (1281)," Mitteilungen des Instituts für Österreichische Geschichtsforschung 21 (1910), pp. 1–53.
 E. H. Rohde, Der Kampf um Sizilien in den Jahren 1291-1302 (Berlin and Leipzig 1913).
 Peter Herde, Colestin V (1294) (Peter vom Morone): Der Engelpapa (Stuttgart, 1981). 
 Steven Runciman (1960), The Sicilian Vespers Cambridge: Cambridge University Press.
 Pietro Maria Silanos (2008). Gerardo Bianchi da Parma. La biografia di un cardinale duecentesco. . Parma: Università degli Studi di Parma, Dottorato di ricerca in Storia, XXI Ciclo (2007–2008).

External links

 The Consortium of European Research Libraries (CERL). CERL page for "Gerardus, da Parma"

1220s births
1302 deaths
13th-century Italian cardinals
Cardinal-bishops of Sabina
Deans of the College of Cardinals
Year of birth uncertain
14th-century Italian cardinals